Three regiments of the United States Army have used the designation 44th Infantry Regiment; one during the War of 1812, one during the Reconstruction, and one regiment of the Philippine Scouts.

War of 1812

The 44th Infantry Regiment (United States) was a regular United States Army regiment of infantry that served during the War of 1812.

The 44th Infantry Regiment was formed 29 January 1813 and consolidated with the 2nd Infantry, 3rd Infantry, and 7th Infantry regiments, 17 May 1815, to form the 1st Infantry Regiment. The regiment was recruited in Louisiana. Its colonel was George Thompson Ross of Pennsylvania.

Reconstruction

The 44th Infantry Regiment (United States) was a regular United States Army regiment of infantry that served during the Reconstruction.

Philippine Scouts

The 44th (Philippine Scout) Infantry Regiment (44th INF (PS)) was part of USAFFE's Philippine Division during World War II.
During WWI 8 Philippine Scout Battalions were grouped into 4 provisional Regiments, but were dissolved in 1920-21 when they were replaced by the creation of the 43, 44, 45, & 57 infantry Regiments (Philippine Scouts or P.S.), into which many of the surviving original scout companies were subsumed. For example, the "2nd Company, Native Scouts, Macabebes" of 1901, eventually became Company D, 45th Infantry Regiment (PS), on 2 December 1920. Also during WWI the Philippine Assembly created the Philippine National Guard, which it offered to augment the AEF (American Expeditionary Force) under Pershing. The force grew to 25,000 men, but it never left the Philippines. However, a few Filipinos did see action. After the war, the National Guard was deactivated and it's officers were placed on a Reserve list.
At the same time of the creation of the Philippine Scout Infantry Regiments, some of the Scout Companies that had formed a Provisional Artillery unit in 1918 were converted into Batteries of the 24th Field Artillery Regt (PS). A number of other Scout Companies were mustered out or demobilized in 1920-1921 and their personnel transferred to create wholly new units; 25th Field Artillery Regiment (PS), 91st & 92nd Coast Artillery Regiment (PS) and the 26th Cavalry Regiment (PS), service and support units were organized in the Engineer, Medical, Military Police, and Quartermaster Branches. In 1921, many of the Infantry and Field Artillery Regiments were grouped together to form the U.S. Army's Philippine Division. From this point onward, the Scouts became the U.S. Army's first line of land Defense in the western Pacific.

44th Infantry (P.S.) in Hawaii

After the disbanding of the National Guard Regiments in August, 1919, the heavy duty of manning the garrison at Fort Shafter and Schofield Barracks fell to the 17th Regiment, US Cavalry Corps. They arrived in Hawaii during the Spring of 1919. They were based at the Schofield Barracks until 25 September 1920. On 25 September 1920, the 35th infantry Regiment & 44th infantry Regiment (PS) arrived for permanent station in Hawaii.This being said, the 44th Infantry Regiment was deactivated during 1922 at Fort Shafter, Hawaii.

The Philippine Division, now redesignated the 12th Infantry Division (PS), was reactivated in 1946, along with its component units, primarily to compensate for the demobilization of American army units. The 44th Infantry Regiment (PS) was reformed for occupation duty on Okinawa and inactivated in 1949.

References

Infantry regiments of the United States Army
American military units and formations of the War of 1812
Military units and formations established in 1813
Military units and formations disestablished in 1815
United States Army regiments of World War I